Lehliu is a commune in Călărași County, Muntenia, Romania. It is composed of two villages, Lehliu and Săpunari. As of 2011, the population of Lehliu is 2,730. 

The commune lies in the Bărăgan Plain. It is located in the northern part of the county,  from the town of Lehliu Gară, on the border with Ialomița County. Lehliu is crossed by the national road DN3; the A2 motorway runs just south of the commune.

Natives
 Mimi Brănescu (born 1974), actor
 Mircea Minescu (born 1971), footballer

References

Lehliu
Localities in Muntenia